CFHS as an acronym can refer to the following:

High Schools:
 Camden Fairview High School — a high school in Ouachita County, Arkansas
 Cape Fear High School — a high school in Fayetteville, North Carolina
 Carolina Forest High School — a high school in Horry County, South Carolina
 Catalina Foothills High School — a high school in Tucson, Arizona
 Cedar Falls High School — a high school in Cedar Falls, Iowa
 Central Falls High School — a high school in Central Falls, Rhode Island
 Chagrin Falls High School — a high school in Chagrin Falls, Ohio
 Chippewa Falls High School — a high school in Chippewa Falls,  Wisconsin
 Colonial Forge High School — a high school in Stafford, Virginia
 Copley Fairlawn High School*
 Columbia Falls High School — a high school in Columbia Falls, Montana
 Cuyahoga Falls High School — a high school in Cuyahoga Falls, Ohio
 Cypress Falls High School — a high school near Houston, Texas
Chenango Forks High School a high school in Binghamton, New York
 Clear Fork High School — a high school in between Bellville and Butler, Ohio
 Clear Falls High School — a high school near Houston, Texas
Societies:
 Canadian Federation of Humane Societies
 Conservatives for Higher Standards — a project of the Foundation for Excellence in Education and the Thomas B. Fordham Institute
Sometimes CFHS can be short for Coffeehouse